Kunle Adetokunbo  (31 May 1972 – 1 April 2022) was a Nigerian actor popularly known as Dejo Tunfulu.

Background 
Adetokunbo was born in Idumota, near Lagos, Ogun State, and hailed from Ikija Abeokuta. He attended Ansar-Ud-Deen primary school in Lagos and went further to obtain a certificate in printing from Modern Way Nigeria School of Printing.

His career started in 1987 in a television series titled ‘Apere Ijongbon.’ He got his nickname ‘Dejo Tunfulu’ by acting as a stammerer in comic roles. Another source says he began his acting career in the television program 'Theatre Omode' and became known by the name Dejo in the movie 'Aje ni Iya mi,' in which he played the role of Dejo.

Filmography 
 Apere Ijongbon (1987)
 Yemi my Lover (1993)
 Ejide (2007)
 Ito (2008)
 Hally The Drummer (2016)
 Jide Jendo (2020)

References

External links
 

1972 births
2022 deaths
People from Lagos State
Place of death missing
Nigerian male film actors
Male actors in Yoruba cinema
Nigerian male television actors
Yoruba male actors
Nigerian male comedians
20th-century Nigerian male actors
21st-century Nigerian male actors